Good Hands may refer to:
 Good Hands (Arthurian legend), a Knight of the Round Table in Arthurian Legend
 Good Hands Records, an independent hip hop record label
 Good Hands (film), Estonian-Latvian 2001 feature film

See also
 Goodhand